Poplar Grove (founded in 1859) is a village located in Poplar Grove and Belvidere Townships, Boone County, Illinois, United States. It is part of the Rockford Metropolitan Statistical Area, and of the gated community Candlewick Lake. The population was 5,049 at the 2020 census.

History
Poplar Grove was named in 1845 for a grove of poplar trees near the original town site. A post office called Poplar Grove has been in operation since 1848.

January 2008 tornado

On January 7, 2008, on an unusually warm day which saw temperatures reach the mid , a tornado struck northern Illinois, including Poplar Grove and Candlewick Lake. The tornado severely damaged a favorite local attraction, Edward's Apple Orchard. There was one serious injury reported and the damage was widespread. The tornado was later rated EF4 on the Enhanced Fujita Scale. A weather event this big had not occurred in the area since 1967. The tornado was one of the only eight rated EF4 during the time span of the warm weather, which lasted from January 7 to January 10. Although there were no losses, it was still a very severe storm. The following month the cast of the TV show "Storm Chasers" visited Caledonia Elementary School to talk about tornadoes and the effects they have on communities. The students and the "Storm Chasers" were featured on a Rockford's "23 WIFR News" story on the January 2008 tornado.

April 2015 tornadoes

On April 9, 2015 northern Illinois was hit with another tornado. This time there were four in the surrounding areas of Rockford, Rochelle, and Belvidere. These tornadoes all broke the record for the last tornado to touch down in the area, and destroyed another favorite attraction, the Summerfield Zoo in Belvidere, as well as killing some of the animals. The rest were all rescued by 200 volunteers who showed up to help the day following the tornadoes.

Geography

Demographics

As of the 2020 census there were 5,049 people, 1,501 households, and 1,310 families residing in the village. The racial makeup of the village was 80.23% White, 2.16% African American, 0.38% Native American, 0.81% Asian, 0.02% Pacific Islander, 5.88% from other races, and 10.52% from two or more races. Hispanic or Latino of any race were 15.31% of the population.

There were 1,501 households, out of which 88.07% had children under the age of 18 living with them, 81.55% were married couples living together, 3.26% had a female householder with no husband present, and 12.72% were non-families. 11.73% of all households were made up of individuals, and 2.07% had someone living alone who was 65 years of age or older. The average household size was 3.26 and the average family size was 3.00.

The village's age distribution consisted of 32.4% under the age of 18, 5.7% from 18 to 24, 27.5% from 25 to 44, 26.8% from 45 to 64, and 7.5% who were 65 years of age or older. The median age was 37.1 years. For every 100 females, there were 88.4 males. For every 100 females age 18 and over, there were 90.7 males.

The median income for a household in the village was $74,896, and the median income for a family was $79,115. Males had a median income of $65,208 versus $33,750 for females. The per capita income for the village was $38,756. About 5.3% of families and 5.5% of the population were below the poverty line, including 10.0% of those under age 18 and 0.0% of those age 65 or over.

Notable people
Rob Sherman (c. 1953 – December 9, 2016), atheist activist, perennial candidate, and businessman who lived in Poplar Grove for a few months before his death.

See also

 Poplar Grove Airport

References

External links
 

Villages in Boone County, Illinois
Villages in Illinois
Rockford metropolitan area, Illinois
1845 establishments in Illinois